"Supercollider" and "The Butcher" are songs by the English alternative rock band Radiohead, released as a double A-side in April 2011 for Record Store Day and June in North America. Radiohead worked on both songs during the sessions for their eighth album, The King of Limbs (2011).

History 
Singer Thom Yorke first performed "Supercollider" solo on 6 June 2008 at Malahide Castle, Dublin. Radiohead worked on it during the recording of their eighth album, The King of Limbs, but did not finish it until March 2011, one month after the album's release. The song features a "calm electronic pulse".

"The Butcher" was recorded and mixed during the King of Limbs sessions, but Radiohead decided it did not fit the album. It features "stuttering" drums and a one-note bassline.

Release 
"Supercollider / The Butcher" was released as a double A-side single on 12-inch vinyl on 16 April, 2011, for Record Store Day. On 18 April, Radiohead released downloads of the tracks to those who had ordered The King of Limbs from their website.

Reception 
Rolling Stone described the songs as "superb electro ballads" that would have fit the "moodier second half" of The King of Limbs, and awarded the single 4 out of 5. The Guardian wrote that "Supercollider" had a "a lovely rise and fall", and particularly praised Yorke's falsetto. However, the Vulture critic Marc Hogan felt that "The Butcher" had "impressively rumbling percussion, but, by Radiohead standards, not too much more".

In 2021, Stereogum writer Chris Deville wrote that "Supercollider" was "the kind of epic that can work as an album’s centerpiece and spine", and that "The Butcher" combined dance beats with "Radiohead’s most dirge-like tendencies in fascinating ways". He speculated that The King of Limbs would be a fan favourite had it included the songs along with "The Daily Mail" and "Staircase", also released that year.

Track listing

Charts

References

External links

2011 singles
Radiohead songs
Record Store Day releases
Song recordings produced by Nigel Godrich